Mamusha ( or Mamuša or Mamusha;) is a town and municipality located in the Prizren District of Kosovo. According to the 2011 census, the municipality has a population of 5,507.

In 2008 it became a municipality after being split from Prizren municipality. Of all municipal units in Kosovo, this one is by far the smallest in terms of area along with North Mitrovica, with only .

The town is located on the northern part of Prizren. It also borders Gjakova and Suharekë.

Demographics

According to the last official census done in 2011, the municipality of Mamushë has 5,507 inhabitants. Based on the population estimates from the Kosovo Agency of Statistics in 2016, the municipality has 5,897 inhabitants.

Ethnic groups
The municipality is a primarily composed of ethnic Turks. It is the only settlement in Kosovo where Turks hold a majority.

The ethnic composition of the municipality:

Twin towns – sister cities
 Büyükçekmece, Turkey

See also 
 Turks in Kosovo

Notes and references 

Notes:

References:

External links 
 Municipality of Mamuša

Populated places in Kosovo
Turkish communities outside Turkey
Municipalities of Kosovo
Populated places in Prizren District